The Lali, sometimes written as Lalee, are a Jat clan, found mainly in the Chiniot district of Punjab, Pakistan.

History
The Lali are one of a number of Jat clans that have lived in the Kirana Bar for centuries. They are mostly landlords and influential people. The tribe has produced a famous Sufi saint, Mian Muhammad Siddique Lali, who has given them a status of sanctity among the other Bar tribes. 

Their traditional seat of power was the village of Kawenwala, but this was reduced to a petty chieftainship with the arrival of the British. This village has many people from Lali tribe even today. The Lalis also founded the town of Lalian, literally the place of the Lali, where many Lalis still live. They have won many elections from the constituency around Lalian Tehsil which has made them politically strong among other clans of the region.

The Lalis also have a few settlements outside the Chiniot District, for example in Sargodha District.

Notable people
 Ghulam Muhammad Lali, Member of National Assembly of Pakistan from Chiniot District, Punjab, Pakistan
Imtiaz Ahmad Lali, Member, Provincial Assembly of the Punjab (2013 - 2018)
Taimoor Ali Lali, Member, Provincial Assembly of the Punjab (2018 - present)

References 

Surnames
Jat clans of Punjab
Punjabi tribes
Social groups of Punjab, Pakistan